The Paraguay women's national football team represents Paraguay in international women's football and is controlled by the Paraguayan Football Association (Asociación Paraguaya de Fútbol). La Albirroja has never reached the World Cup finals, but has finished fourth in both the 2006 Sudamericano Femenino and the 2022 Copa América Femenina, the only times they were not eliminated in the Group stage. Most of Paraguay's matches are in Competitions rather than friendlies.

History
While South America has begun to taste the first sense of women's football since late 1980s, Paraguay has been a latecomer in this aspect, as the country didn't form a team for most of the 1990s decade. Only by 1998, when the third edition of Copa América Femenina occurred, Paraguay finally fielded its team to debut in a major tournament, when Paraguay beat Uruguay 3–2. Nonetheless, Paraguay failed to progress, finished third in the group stage with two wins and two losses. Paraguay's performance did not improve in 2003, once again got eliminated with just a win. Paraguay made its first real development in 2006, finishing fourth by reaching the final group stage. After that 2006 performance, Paraguay failed to do so in the next three editions, all eliminated in the group stage.

With the expansion of the FIFA Women's World Cup, Paraguay also came to be benefited from the expansion. In 2022, Paraguay achieved a respectable performance, successfully qualified to the knockout stage with three wins and one loss in the group stage, including an impressive 3–2 victory over 2019 FIFA Women's World Cup debutant Chile. However, Paraguay was downed by powerhouse Brazil 0–2 in the semi-finals, before losing 1–3 to Argentina in the third place playoffs, after taking the lead in the first half, thus repeated the 2006 performance in fourth place. But with the 2023 FIFA Women's World Cup expanded to 32 teams, Paraguay qualified for the intercontinental playoffs for the first time in the history, where its quest for the maiden World Cup debut continues.

Team image

Nicknames
The Paraguay women's national football team has been known or nicknamed as "Las Guaraníes" or "La Albirroja".

Home stadium
The Paraguay play their home matches on the Estadio Defensores del Chaco.

Results and fixtures

The following is a list of match results in the last 12 months, as well as any future matches that have been scheduled.

Legend

2022

2023

Paraguay Results and Fixtures – Soccerway.com

Coaching staff

Current coaching staff

Manager history

  Eduardo Poletti (2003)
  Esteban von Lucken (2006)
  Agustín Cabrera (2006)
  Nelson Basualdo (2010)
  Julio Gómez (2014)
  Rubén Subeldía (2018)
  Epifania Benítez (2019–2021)
  Marcello Frigério (2021–)

Players

Current squad
 The following players were called up for two friendly matches against  on 10 and 13 November 2022.

Caps noted are current as of 8 April 2021, after match against , per above sources.

Recent call-ups
 The following players have been called up to a Paraguay squad in the past 12 months.

Records

 Active players in bold, statistics correct as of 2020.

Most capped players

Top goalscorers

Competitive record

FIFA Women's World Cup

*Draws include knockout matches decided on penalty kicks.

Olympic Games

*Draws include knockout matches decided on penalty kicks.

CONMEBOL Copa América Femenina

*Draws include knockout matches decided on penalty kicks.

Pan American Games

*Draws include knockout matches decided on penalty kicks.

See also
 Sport in Paraguay
 Football in Paraguay
 Women's football in Paraguay
 Paraguay women's national under-20 football team
 Paraguay women's national under-17 football team
 Paraguay men's national football team

References

External links
Official website
FIFA profile

 
South American women's national association football teams
National